Bunyamudin Arifovich Mustafayev (born 7 September 1992) is a Russian football player.

Club career
He made his debut in the Russian Second Division for FC Torpedo Armavir on 31 July 2013 in a game against FC MITOS Novocherkassk.

He made his Russian Football National League debut for FC Fakel Voronezh on 12 March 2016 in a game against FC Tyumen.

References

External links
 
 

1992 births
People from Akhtynsky District
Living people
Russian footballers
Association football defenders
Association football forwards
Association football midfielders
FC Chernomorets Novorossiysk players
FC Fakel Voronezh players
FC Armavir players
FC Kuban Krasnodar players
FC Mashuk-KMV Pyatigorsk players
Sportspeople from Dagestan
20th-century Russian people
21st-century Russian people